This is the complete list of Asian Games medalists in gymnastics from 1974 to 2018.

Men's artistic

Team

Individual all-around

Floor

Pommel horse

Rings

Vault

Parallel bars

Horizontal bar

Women's artistic

Team

Individual all-around

Vault

Uneven bars

Balance beam

Floor

Rhythmic

Team

Individual all-around

Trampoline

Men's individual

Women's individual

References 

Medalists from previous Asian Games – Men – Individual
Medalists from previous Asian Games – Men – Team
Medalists from previous Asian Games – Women – Individual
Medalists from previous Asian Games – Women – Team

External links 
 Gymnastics Results

Gymnastics
medalists

Asian